Lawrence Sulak (born August 29, 1944) is an American physicist, currently the David M. Myers Distinguished Professor at Boston University. Some of Sulak's research has included Higgs detection at the Compact Muon Solenoid in the Large Hadron Collider, neutrino physics, astrophysics, and contributing work for the Monopole, Astrophysics and Cosmic Ray Observatory.

The 1986 book Second Creation on the history of modern particle physics by Robert Crease and Charles Mann opened with a description of being escorted by Larry Sulak down to the experimental halls of the salt mine under Lake Erie in Ohio converted to a proton decay detector designed by Sulak and the rest of the Irvine Michigan Brookhaven collaboration. The 1996 update of the book has replaced this description with another physicist led tour of another Sulak experimental collaboration effort on the muon g-2 measurement at Brookhaven National Laboratory. The earlier career achievements of Sulak after his PhD dissertation work in the early 1970s were described by Peter Galison in a history of neutral currents which appeared in Reviews of Modern Physics.

References

Living people
Boston University faculty
21st-century American physicists
Winners of the Panofsky Prize
1944 births